Miralda superba is a species of sea snail, a marine gastropod mollusc in the family Pyramidellidae, the pyrams and their allies.

Distribution
This species occurs in the Atlantic Ocean off Angola.

References

 Rolán, E.; Fernandes, F. (1993 ["1992"]). El genero Miralda A. Adams, 1864 (Gastropoda: Pyramidellidae) en Africa occidental, con la descripcion de dos especies nuevas. Notiziario CISMA. 15, 5-12.

External links
 To World Register of Marine Species

Endemic fauna of Angola
Pyramidellidae
Gastropods described in 1993